The New Zealand women's national cricket team toured England between May and August 1954. They played against England in three Test matches, with England winning the series 1–0.

Squads

Tour Matches

1-day single innings match: Warwickshire and South Midlands v New Zealand

1-day single innings match: North Midlands v New Zealand

2-day match: Midland Counties v New Zealand

1-day single innings match: Yorkshire v New Zealand

2-day match: North of England v New Zealand

1-day single innings match: Northern Counties v New Zealand

1-day single innings match: Oxfordshire, Berkshire and Sussex v New Zealand

1-day match: Western Counties v New Zealand

2-day match: West of England v New Zealand

1-day single innings match: Western Counties v New Zealand

1-day single innings match: East Anglia v New Zealand

1-day single innings match: Essex and Kent v New Zealand

2-day match: East of England v New Zealand

1-day single innings match: South of England Second XI v New Zealand

2-day match: South of England v New Zealand

1-day single innings match: Combined Services v New Zealand

WTest Series

1st Test

2nd Test

3rd Test

References

External links
New Zealand Women tour of England 1954 from Cricinfo

Women's cricket tours of England
1954 in English cricket
New Zealand women's national cricket team tours